Alexander Vadimovich Rumyantsev (born 5 December 1986) is a Russian speed skater.

Career
Rumyantsev competed at the 2010 and 2014 Winter Olympics for Russia. In 2010, he was disqualified in the 5000 metres, and was 13th in the 10000 metres. In 2014, he finished 11th in the 5000 metres. He was also a part of the Russian team pursuit squad, losing to South Korea in the quarter-finals, then losing to Norway in final C, finishing 6th.

As of September 2014, Rumyantsev's best performance at the World Single Distance Speed Skating Championships is 6th, in the 2011 team pursuit. His best individual finish is 9th, in the 2013 10000 m. His best finish at the World Allround Speed Skating Championships is 22nd, in 2009.

Rumyantsev made his World Cup debut in December 2007. As of September 2014, Rumyantsev has one World Cup victory, as part of the Russian team pursuit squad at Moscow in 2010–11 He also has an individual medal, a bronze in a 5000 m race at Heerenveen in 2013–14. His best overall finish in the World Cup is 8th, in the 5000 & 10000 m in 2013–14.

On 24 November 2017, Rumyantsevs' results from the 2014 Winter Olympics were disqualified for a doping violation.

World Cup podiums

Overall rankings

References

External links

1986 births
Living people
Russian male speed skaters
Speed skaters at the 2010 Winter Olympics
Speed skaters at the 2014 Winter Olympics
Speed skaters at the 2022 Winter Olympics
Olympic speed skaters of Russia
Sportspeople from Arkhangelsk
Russian sportspeople in doping cases
Doping cases in speed skating
World Single Distances Speed Skating Championships medalists